Mount Stump is a mostly ice-free mountain rising to 2,490 metres, located 1 nautical mile (1.9 km) north-northeast of Mount Colbert and 2 nautical miles (3.7 km) northeast of Mount Borcik in the southeast part of the Hays Mountains of the Queen Maud Mountains in Antarctica.

It was mapped by the United States Geological Survey from surveys and U.S. Navy aerial photographs from 1960–64.

It was named by the Advisory Committee on Antarctic Names after geologist Edmund Stump from Arizona State University. Stump was also a geological investigator for the United States Antarctic Research Program (USARP) at the following places: lower Shackleton Glacier (1970–71), Duncan Mountains (1974–75), Leverett Glacier (1977–78), Scott Glacier and Byrd Glacier (1978–79), and at the La Gorce Mountains (1980–81). He was also the chief scientist of the International Northern Victoria Land Project (1981–82) and did additional investigations in the McMurdo Dry Valleys (January 1983) and the Nimrod Glacier area (1985–86).

Mountains of the Ross Dependency
Amundsen Coast